Prunus mexicana, commonly known as the Mexican plum, is a North American species of plum tree that can be found in the central United States and Northern Mexico.

Description 
It has dark green, simple ovate leaves, fragrant white or pale pink flowers, and dark gray bark banded with horizontal lenticels. Early in the spring it is covered with clouds of white fragrant flowers that are up to an inch wide. The dark red or purple fruit ripens late in the fall.

Prunus mexicana is very similar to Prunus americana, and they intergrade along a broad contact zone centered around Arkansas and Missouri. These intermediate individuals may be impossible to assign to a specific species.

Taxonomy 
Prunus mexicana is included in the section Prunocerasus.

Distribution and habitat
The native range of the species stretches from South Dakota east to Wisconsin, Ohio, Kentucky, and Georgia, and south to the Mexican states of Coahuila and San Luis Potosí.

It is usually found on woodland edges or in open fields. It is adaptable to a wide range of soil pH and is drought-tolerant. The trees are hardy in U.S. Department of Agriculture zones 7 to 9.

Ecology
The fruit is eaten fresh by both animals.

Uses
The fruit is made into preserves.

The tree is widely cultivated, such as on the west coast of the United States.

Gallery

References

External links
 
 photo of herbarium specimen at Missouri Botanical Garden, collected in Nebraska in 2014

mexicana
mexicana
Trees of Mexico
Trees of the United States
Flora of the United States
Flora of the Southeastern United States
Flora of Coahuila
Flora of Nuevo León
Flora of San Luis Potosí
Flora of Tamaulipas
Plants described in 1882
Taxa named by Sereno Watson